Phillip Shead is a former professional rugby league footballer who played for Paris Saint-Germain and represented both New Zealand Māori and France.

Playing career
Shead was a Northcote Tigers junior along with his younger brother; Artie. In 1992 he represented the New Zealand under-15 side. He went on to represent both Auckland and Taranaki alongside his brother. In 1996 he played in the Super League for the French club Paris Saint-Germain.

He represented New Zealand Māori in three "tests" in 1999 and on a tour of France in 2003. On the French tour he played against his brother, who by then had gained French residency. While playing for the Villeneuve Leopards, Shead himself qualified for France and played at the 2004 Victory Cup.

In 2005, while playing for Mount Albert, he was part of a New Zealand Rugby League's President selection that played a pre-season trial match against the New Zealand Warriors.

References

1977 births
New Zealand rugby league players
New Zealand Māori rugby league players
New Zealand Māori rugby league team players
Auckland rugby league team players
Taranaki rugby league team players
Paris Saint-Germain Rugby League players
Villeneuve Leopards players
Rugby league second-rows
Northcote Tigers players
Mount Albert Lions players
New Zealand expatriate rugby league players
Expatriate rugby league players in France
New Zealand expatriate sportspeople in France
Living people